Marionna Schlatter (14 November 1980) is a Swiss politician of the Green Party of Switzerland, and a former member of the Cantonal Council of Zurich and current member of the National Council.

Early life and education 
She was born to a Swiss father and Hungarian mother and attended primary school in Bäretswil and secondary school in Wetzikon. Following she enrolled into the University of Zurich studying History of Art and Architecture, Sociology and French, graduating with a MSc in 2007.

Political career 
She was the campaigner for the Youth wing of the Green Party between 2008 and 2010 and the President of the Green Party of the Canton Zurich from 2011 until 2020. She was elected in the Cantonal Council of Zurich in March 2019 and in the National Council in October 2019. In 2019, she was also a candidate to the Council of States, but was not elected. Following her election to the National Council, she resigned from the Cantonal Council of Zurich. She is currently a member of the board of directors of the Zurich branch of the Green Party.

Personal life 
She became a mushroom expert at the age of fourteen and today she is teaching others how to classify mushrooms. She is married and has 2 children.

References 

Living people
Green Party of Switzerland politicians
Members of the National Council (Switzerland)
1980 births
21st-century Swiss women politicians
21st-century Swiss politicians
University of Zurich alumni
Politicians from Zürich